The Main road 338 is a short bypass direction Secondary class main road near Nyíregyháza, that connects the M3 motorway's Nyíregyháza-nyugat junction to the Main road 37 and Local road 3822.

The road, as well as all other main roads in Hungary, is managed and maintained by Magyar Közút, state owned company.

See also

 Roads in Hungary

Sources

External links
 Hungarian Public Road Non-Profit Ltd. (Magyar Közút Nonprofit Zrt.)
 National Infrastructure Developer Ltd.

Main roads in Hungary
Szabolcs-Szatmár-Bereg County